Michał Grabowski, born 25 September 1804 in Złotyjów, Volhynia, died 19 November 1863 in Warsaw, was a Polish author.

Grabowski was a director of the "education commission" in Warsaw.

References 
 

1804 births
1863 deaths
19th-century Polish male writers
Writers from Warsaw